Chepya is a Southern Loloish language of northern Laos.

Chepya of Sano Kao village, Bun Tay District, Phongsaly Province, Laos is documented in Kingsada & Shintani (1999).

References

Sources 
 Kingsadā, Thō̜ngphet, and Tadahiko Shintani. 1999. Basic Vocabularies of the Languages Spoken in Phongxaly, Lao P.D.R. Tokyo: Institute for the Study of Languages and Cultures of Asia and Africa (ILCAA).

Southern Loloish languages